Peter Germain (born 22 January 1982) is a Haitian footballer who plays as a midfielder for Baltimore SC.

Club career
Germain has so far been with Baltimore SC his entire career.

International career
Germain made his debut for Haiti in a May 2001 Caribbean Cup match against St Kitts. He was a Haiti squad member at the 2002 and 2007 Gold Cup Finals and he played in 1 World Cup qualification match in 2004.

Honours
Haiti
 Caribbean Nations Cup: 2007

External links

References

1982 births
Living people
People from Saint-Marc
Haitian footballers
Association football midfielders
Haiti international footballers
2007 CONCACAF Gold Cup players
Ligue Haïtienne players
Baltimore SC players